Sekincau is a volcano with two calderas, Belirang (2 km wide) and Balak (2.5 km wide), located in the south of Sumatra, Indonesia. A 300 m wide of crater is found at the summit. Fumarole activities are found at the foot of calderas.

See also 

 List of volcanoes in Indonesia

References 

Volcanoes of Sumatra
Mountains of Sumatra
Calderas of Indonesia